Denise Feierabend (born 15 April 1989) is a Swiss former World Cup alpine ski racer. Born in Engelberg, Obwalden, she competed for Switzerland at the 2014 and 2018 Winter Olympics.

At the 2018 Winter Olympics in Pyeongchang, Feierabend won the gold medal in the team competition, which was held for the first time, on 24 February as part of the Swiss team (with Wendy Holdener, Luca Aerni, Daniel Yule and Ramon Zenhäusern). Three weeks after the end of the season, she announced her retirement from top-level sport on 8 April 2018.

World Cup results

Season standings

Standings through 4 February 2018

Race podiums
 0 podiums 
 9 top tens (best finishes - fourth in slalom and combined)

World Championship results

Olympic results

References

External links

Denise Feierabend World Cup standings at the International Ski Federation

Swiss Ski team – official site – 
Head Skis – athletes – race – Denise Feierabend
 

1989 births
Living people
Olympic alpine skiers of Switzerland
Alpine skiers at the 2014 Winter Olympics
Alpine skiers at the 2018 Winter Olympics
Swiss female alpine skiers
Medalists at the 2018 Winter Olympics
Olympic medalists in alpine skiing
Olympic gold medalists for Switzerland
People from Obwalden
21st-century Swiss women